The 2023 Firestone Indy NXT Series season is the 21st season of the primary support series for the IndyCar Series, sanctioned by IndyCar. Known as Indy Lights before 2023, the championship was rebranded following its acquisition by Penske Entertainment, the owner of INDYCAR, in 2022. This rebrand coincided with the three lower support series, still run by Anderson Promotions, also changing their branding.

Linus Lundqvist, the reigning 2022 Indy Lights champion, became a free agent after the season, so he did not defend his championship.

Series news 

 On June 22, 2022, it was announced that after seven seasons, Cooper Tires would be replaced as tire supplier by Firestone.
 As part of the rebrand, the prize structure was changed. The champion will receive a sum of $850,000 to spend on tests at Texas Motor Speedway and Indianapolis Motor Speedway as well as to run the 2024 Indianapolis 500 and an additional IndyCar race. The drivers finishing second and third in the championship will receive $125,000 and $65,000 respectively.

Team and driver chart 
The following drivers and teams compete in the series.

 Legacy Autosport planned to enter the series, but later confirmed it would not do so.

Team changes
 In July 2022, Cape Motorsports, a long-time USF2000 team with consistent success, announced they would enter Indy NXT for 2023. They won the 2022 USF2000 Driver's Championship with Michael d'Orlando.
 In September 2022, Juncos Hollinger Racing announced its return to the series after not competing in 2022 to focus on their IndyCar entry.
 In October 2022, Force Indy announced a collaboration with HMD Motorsports to co-run the No. 99 entry under the HMD Motorsports with Force Indy guise.

Schedule 
The schedule was released on November 3, 2022; with the only minor change from last season being the changed location of the Detroit round from Belle Isle to downtown Detroit. A small update to the schedule was announced on February 22, 2023: the Indianapolis doubleheader was split, with one race running on the GMR Grand Prix weekend and the other race moved to the NASCAR Cup Series Verizon 200 weekend in August.

Race results

Championship standings

Drivers' Championship 

 Scoring system

 The driver who qualifies on pole is awarded one additional point.
 Every driver who leads at least one lap is awarded a bonus point, the driver who leads the most laps gets two points.

Teams' championship 

 Scoring system

 Single car teams receive 3 bonus points as an equivalency to multi-car teams
 Only the best two results count for teams fielding more than two entries

See also 
 2023 IndyCar Series
 2023 USF Pro 2000 Championship
 2023 USF2000 Championship
 2023 USF Juniors

References

External links 
 

Indy Lights seasons
Indy NXT
Indy NXT
Indy NXT